Diaethria gabaza is a species of butterfly of the genus Diaethria. It was described by William Chapman Hewitson in 1852. It is found from Costa Rica and Guatemala to Colombia, Ecuador and Venezuela.

The larvae feed on Serjania species.

Subspecies
Diaethria gabaza gabaza (Colombia)
Diaethria gabaza eupepla (Salvin & Godman, 1868) (Costa Rica, Guatemala to Colombia)
Diaethria gabaza gabazina (Oberthür, 1916) (Colombia, Venezuela)

References

Biblidinae
Butterflies described in 1852